Juha Pasoja (born 16 November 1976) is a retired Finnish football defender and football coach. He was most recently the head coach of Dreams FC in Ghana.

Pasoja has also played for FC Haka, KPT-85 and FC Jazz, and has 151 matches and 19 goals in the Veikkausliiga. In addition he has been capped 15 times for Finland.

References

External links

Juha Pasoja at Footballdatabase

1976 births
Living people
Finnish footballers
Finland international footballers
FC Jazz players
Hamarkameratene players
JJK Jyväskylä players
Finnish expatriate footballers
Expatriate footballers in Norway
Finnish expatriate sportspeople in Norway
Eliteserien players
People from Kemi
Association football defenders
Dreams F.C. (Ghana) managers
Sportspeople from Lapland (Finland)